Kieran Healy is an Irish sociologist, a professor of sociology at Duke University, a member of the Kenan Institute for Ethics at Duke, and a regular visitor to the Research School in Social Science (RSSS) at the Australian National University.  He earned his PhD in sociology from Princeton University having begun his studies at University College Cork, in Ireland. His research interests include the social basis of self-interest and altruism, the organization of exchange in human goods (like blood, organs, eggs and genetic material), and the role of volunteering in the open source software movement.  In 2002, he was awarded the American Sociological Association's Dissertation Award for "Exchange in Blood and Organs."

Kieran was a successful college debater while at UCC, winning the Irish Times National Debating competition having previously been Munster and All Ireland Schools' Debating Champion. He was a loyal member of the UCC Philosophical Society (the Philosoph).

Healy is a member of the Crooked Timber and orgtheory.net group blogs.

Selected publications
 Altruism as an organizational problem: The case of organ procurement American Sociological Review , 69:387-404, 2004, PDF
 Digital technology and cultural goods Journal of Political Philosophy, 10(4):478-500, 2002, PDF
 Last Best Gifts: Altruism and the Market for Human Blood and Organs. University of Chicago Press (Chicago, 2006).  Description.
 Data Visualization: A Practical Introduction. Princeton University Press (2018) Description. 
 Fuck Nuance Sociological Theory, 35(2):118-127, 2017, PDF

References

External links
 Kieran Healy's website
 OrgTheory group blog

Healy,Kieran
Duke University faculty
American male bloggers
American bloggers
Living people
Center for Advanced Study in the Behavioral Sciences fellows
Year of birth missing (living people)